John Smith (born 1831, date of death unknown) was a Union Navy sailor in the American Civil War and a recipient of the U.S. military's highest decoration, the Medal of Honor, for his actions at the Battle of Mobile Bay.

Born in 1831 in Boston, Massachusetts, Smith was still living in that city when he joined the Navy. During the Battle of Mobile Bay on August 5, 1864, Lackawanna engaged the CSS Tennessee at close range but Smith, acting as a gun captain, found that his ship's artillery could not be aimed low enough to hit the Confederate ironclad. The two ships were so close that a Confederate sailor began shouting insults at Lackawanna's crew; Smith responded by throwing a holystone into one of Tennessee's portholes at him. For his actions during the battle, Smith was awarded the Medal of Honor months later, on December 31, 1864.

Smith's official Medal of Honor citation reads:
On board the U.S.S. Lackawanna during the successful attacks against Fort Morgan, rebel gunboats and the ram Tennessee in Mobile Bay, 5 August 1864. Serving as a gun captain and finding he could not depress his gun when alongside the rebel ironclad Tennessee, Smith threw a hand holystone into one of the ports at a rebel using abusive language against the crew of the ship. He continued his daring action throughout the engagement which resulted in the capture of the prize ram Tennessee and in the damaging and destruction of Fort Morgan.

References 

1831 births
Year of death missing
People from Boston
People of Massachusetts in the American Civil War
Union Navy sailors
United States Navy Medal of Honor recipients
American Civil War recipients of the Medal of Honor